Kgosietsile "Kgosi" Ntlhe (born 21 February 1994) is a South African professional soccer player who last played as a defender for English National League club Scunthorpe United.

Club career
Born in Pretoria, Ntlhe joined Peterborough United in 2009 from Southside United and signed a two-year apprenticeship in the summer of 2010. He signed his first professional contract for the club in February 2011. In October 2011, Ntlhe joined Southern Premier side St Albans City on a one-month loan deal. He made his debut for the Saints in a 2–2 draw with Bedford Town. On 21 April 2012, Ntlhe made his professional debut for Posh, coming on as a half-time substitute for Lee Frecklington in a 2–2 draw with Watford. Following the club's relegation to League One in 2013, Ntlhe played regularly in the following two seasons. However, he only made eight appearances in 2015-16 and joined Stevenage on undisclosed terms at the end of that season.

After one season with Stevenage, Ntlhe was released in June 2017.

In July 2017, he joined Rochdale on a two-year contract. He was offered a new contract by Rochdale at the end of the 2018–19 season.

Instead, on 4 July 2019, Ntlhe signed for EFL League Two side Scunthorpe United on a one-year deal.

In September 2020 he signed for League Two newcomers Barrow. After two seasons with the club, he was released in May 2022.

On 12 July 2022, Ntlhe returned to former club Scunthorpe United on a six-month deal following their relegation to the National League. He left the club in January.

International career
In May and June 2012, Ntlhe participated in the 2012 Cape Town International Challenge, an exhibition tournament open to players under 20 years of age. He played in all of South Africa's games, meeting Argentina, Nigeria and Ghana in the group stage before losing to Brazil in the semi-final on penalties after a 2–2 draw. South Africa finished third place in the competition, having beaten Japan on penalties in the third place playoff. In mid-August, Ntlhe was called up to the South African senior team for the first time to play two friendlies against Brazil and Mozambique. He made his international debut on 12 October 2013 in a 1–1 draw against Morocco at the Adrar Stadium.

Drinkwater dispute 
In September 2019, he was involved in a dispute with Danny Drinkwater.

Career statistics

Club

Honours
Peterborough United
Football League Trophy: 2013–14

References

External links

1994 births
Living people
Soccer players from Pretoria
Association football defenders
Peterborough United F.C. players
St Albans City F.C. players
Stevenage F.C. players
Rochdale A.F.C. players
Scunthorpe United F.C. players
Barrow A.F.C. players
English Football League players
Southern Football League players
National League (English football) players
South African soccer players